O Freixo de Sabardes or O Freixo is a village and parish in the Outes Mountain range (Serra de Outes in Galician), which is in the county of Outes, which is in the province of A Coruña, Galiza. In 2012 the population was 991 residents (483 men and 508 women), which was a decrease of 31 from 2011.
The local saint, St John the Evangelist (San Xoán Evanxelista in Galician) is celebrated on 27 of December.

Gallery

External links
Freixo

Populated places in the Province of A Coruña